James Richard Newman (born 19 October 1985) is a British singer and songwriter. During the 2014 Brit Awards, he won the Brit Award for British Single of the Year as a co-writer of "Waiting All Night", a song by English band Rudimental. Newman was selected to represent the United Kingdom at the Eurovision Song Contest 2020 with the song, "My Last Breath" before its cancellation. He instead represented the country in the Eurovision Song Contest 2021 with the song "Embers”, which came in last place with nul points.

Career

2013–2019: Career beginnings with songwriting
As a child, Newman became interested in music, and he wrote and produced songs with his younger brother John Newman. In his 20s, he established himself as a songwriter in London, and in 2013 he co-wrote Rudimental and Ella Eyre's hit "Waiting All Night". The song topped the UK Singles Chart. Newman won the "Brit Award for British Single of the Year" during the 2014 Brit Awards for co-writing "Waiting All Night" with Jonny Harris.

Later, James co-wrote with his brother John Newman and with Calvin Harris the latter's song "Blame", featuring vocals by John. The song, an international hit, topped the UK singles chart, in addition to peaking in Scotland, the Netherlands, Sweden, Norway, Finland and Mexico. It reached number 19 on Billboard Hot 100 and topped the US Billboard Hot Dance/Electronic Songs chart. Newman was also a co-composer of a number of songs including "Let 'Em Talk" on Kesha's 2017 album Rainbow, and "Coping" for Toni Braxton on her 2018 album Sex & Cigarettes.

Newman was a featured vocalist on several songs including the 2018 hit "Therapy" by Dutch DJ Armin van Buuren. The song charted in the Netherlands, Belgium and on the US Dance/Mix Show Airplay chart. The same year he was featured on the song "Lights Go Down", a song by the Norwegian music producer and DJ Matoma in his album One in a Million. In 2019, he was featured on the Armin van Buuren song "High on Your Love".

2020–2021: Eurovision Song Contest and The Things We Do 

On 27 February 2020, the BBC announced that Newman would represent the United Kingdom in the Eurovision Song Contest 2020 in Rotterdam, the Netherlands. He was set to participate with the song "My Last Breath", which Newman co-wrote with Adam Argyle, Ed Drewett and Iain James. However, the 2020 event was later canceled due to the COVID-19 pandemic in Europe. On 17 July 2020, Newman released his debut EP called The Things We Do, which includes the singles "My Last Breath", "Enough" and "Better Man".

On 19 February 2021, it was announced that Newman was reselected to represent the United Kingdom in the Eurovision Song Contest 2021. As one of the Big Five countries in the competition, the UK directly qualified for the final on 22 May. In an interview on Newsbeat, Newman stated: "I feel like everyone wants a party and to have some fun so when I was writing, that's what I had in my head. I wanted something people can dance to, even if it's just in their kitchen". The song "Embers" was released on 11 March 2021. However, the song got "nul points" in the Eurovision final from both juries and televotes and came last.

Personal life 
James Newman was born in Settle in the Yorkshire Dales. When Newman was eleven years old, his father left the family, leaving his mother Jackie to take care of James and his younger brother John all by herself, working as a receptionist. John later became a well-known singer, songwriter, musician and record producer.

Discography

Extended plays

Singles

As lead artist

As featured artist

Songwriting credits
 indicated a background vocals contribution.
 indicates a featured artist contribution.

Notes

References

External links

Living people
English male singer-songwriters
Brit Award winners
Musicians from Yorkshire
People from Settle, North Yorkshire
Eurovision Song Contest entrants for the United Kingdom
Eurovision Song Contest entrants of 2020
Eurovision Song Contest entrants of 2021
1985 births